The Kampala–Mityana Road is a road in the Central Region of Uganda, connecting the capital city of Kampala to the town of Mityana in Mityana District.

Location
The road begins in the Busega neighborhood, in Lubaga Division, northwestern Kampala.

Overview
Prior to 2009, the road was gravel surfaced, in poor condition. As far back as 2003, the government of Uganda planned to upgrade the road surface.

Upgrade to bitumen surface
In 2009, work to upgrade the road surface to grade II bitumen class, with shoulders, culverts and drainage channels. Lea International Limited (Canada) was the supervising contractor for both sections. The road was successfully completed in 2012.

See also
 List of roads in Uganda

References

External links
 Website of Uganda National Roads Authority
  Plane lands on Mityana road

Roads in Uganda
Wakiso District
Mpigi District
Mityana District
Transport in Kampala